Blaine is a census-designated place (CDP) comprising the main village within the town of Blaine in Aroostook County, Maine, United States. The population of the CDP was 301 at the 2010 census, out of a population of 726 for the entire town. Prior to 2010, the village was part of the Mars Hill-Blaine CDP.

Geography
The Blaine CDP is located along the northern edge of the town of Blaine, bordered by the town of Mars Hill to the north. U.S. Route 1 runs through the center of the CDP, leading north  to Presque Isle and south  to Houlton.

Demographics

References

Census-designated places in Maine
Census-designated places in Aroostook County, Maine